Nicolas Pol (born 1977, Paris) is a French contemporary artist.

Biography 
He lives in Africa and in France where he graduated from the École nationale supérieure des beaux-arts and from the University of la Sorbonne, specialized in cinéma.

He works and lives in Paris .

Exhibitions

Group shows 
Plus que vrai, École nationale supérieure des beaux-arts, Paris, 2005 
J'en rêve, Fondation Cartier, Paris, 2005 
Parisites, avec  Julien Berthier et Lilly Phung, London, 2006

Solo shows 
Martus Maw, New York City, 2009 
Mother of Pouacrus The Old Dairy, London, 2010 
Neverlodge, New York City, 2012 
EPEKTASIS, Istanbul, 2012 
After Modern Vermin Control, Milan, 2013 
Hurts twice as much, OSME Galley, Vienna, 2015
 Institut Culturel Bernard Magrez, Bordeaux, 2016 
 Le froid, le feu et le fouet, Galerie D.X, Bordeaux, 2018

Music 
 2014 : Twin Arrows, artwork, with Check Morris Twin Arrows, le nouvel album

References

20th-century French painters
21st-century American painters
21st-century American male artists
French installation artists
1977 births
Painters from Paris
Living people
American male painters
21st-century French painters